The  417 Army Equity Fund Hospital, commonly known by its acronym as NIMTS, is a public general hospital located in the centre of Athens, Greece, near the Megaro Moussikis metro station. 

According to its founding law (AN 1137/1946), NIMTS is a Legal Entity of Public Law, which is overseen by the Ministry of National Defence, through the Hellenic Army General Staff.

The hospital consists of two multi-storey buildings with a total capacity of 405 beds. The second building which is called the "new wing" (νέα πτέρυγα) was inaugurated in 1981. More than 100,000 patients are examined on a yearly basis and more than 15,000 patients are hospitalized. It employs around 1,000 people.

Gallery

References 

Hospitals in Athens
Central Athens (regional unit)
Hellenic Army
1946 establishments in Greece
Hospitals established in 1946